Events from the year 1904 in Denmark.

Incumbents
 Monarch – Christian IX
 Prime minister – Johan Henrik Deuntzer

Events

 12 February – Politikens Ekstrablad is published for the first time.
 7 August  The inauguration of Ribe Cathedral.
 27 August  The inauguration of Odense Canal in Odense is attended by the king.
 17 September – The first Danish cinema, Kosmorama at Østerbrogade in Copenhagen, opens.

Undated
 April – The fingerprint technique is adopted by the Copenhagen Police Force.
 The electrified tramway is extended from Tuborg to Klampenborg.
 The first vacuum cleaners arrive in the country.

Sports
 21 August  Fremad Valby is founded.
 10 September  Thorvald Ellegaard wins silver in men's sprint at the 1904 UCI Track Cycling World Championships.

Births
 26 March – Leck Fischer, writer and playwright (died 1956)
 5 May – Frederik Marcus Knuth, taxonomist and count of Knuthenborg (died 1970)

Deaths
 24 September – Niels Ryberg Finsen (born 1860, in the Faroe Islands)
 6 December – Johan Bartholdy, composer (born 1853)

References

 
Denmark
Years of the 20th century in Denmark
1900s in Denmark
Denmark